Ida Sahmie (born Nobell 1960) is a Navajo potter. Sahmie combines Hopi traditional pottery making methods and Navajo iconography in her work. She has work in the Smithsonian American Art Museum and the Wheelwright Museum of the American Indian.

Biography 
Sahmie is Navajo and was born in 1960 outside of Pine Springs, Arizona. She married a Hopi man, Andrew "Louie" Sahmie, and moved to the Hopi reservation. She learned pottery making from her mother in law, Priscilla Namingha. Sahmie began to sell her pottery in the 1980s.

Work 
The shape of the pottery that Sahmie makes is based on Hopi traditions and incorporates traditional Navajo designs and iconography, such as Yei designs. Sahmie prefers to use clay mined from the Navajo reservation and uses white and yellow clay in the body of the pots. Black slip is created by adding wild spinach to the mixture. Pots are fired outdoors using traditional methods.

Sahmie has work in the Smithsonian American Art Museum, and the Wheelwright Museum of the American Indian.

References 

Living people
1960 births
Navajo artists
Native American women artists
Native American potters
Indigenous women of the Americas
Women potters
American potters
20th-century ceramists
20th-century American women artists
American women ceramists
American ceramists
20th-century Native Americans
21st-century Native Americans
20th-century Native American women
21st-century Native American women